Georgina Louise Parkes (born 30 May 1965) is an Australian former competitive swimmer who won a silver medal in the 200-metre backstroke at the 1982 World Aquatics Championships.  She also competed in four events at the 1980 and 1984 Summer Olympics, with the best achievement of fourth place in the 200-metre backstroke in 1984.

See also
 List of World Aquatics Championships medalists in swimming (women)

References

1965 births
Living people
Australian female backstroke swimmers
Swimmers at the 1980 Summer Olympics
Swimmers at the 1984 Summer Olympics
Olympic swimmers of Australia
Commonwealth Games gold medallists for Australia
Commonwealth Games silver medallists for Australia
Commonwealth Games bronze medallists for Australia
Swimmers at the 1982 Commonwealth Games
Swimmers at the 1986 Commonwealth Games
World Aquatics Championships medalists in swimming
Swimmers from Sydney
Commonwealth Games medallists in swimming
Sportswomen from New South Wales
20th-century Australian women
Medallists at the 1982 Commonwealth Games
Medallists at the 1986 Commonwealth Games